The Grammy Award for Songwriter of the Year, Non-Classical is a new category in the annual Grammy Awards show, introduced in the 65th edition to be held in February, 2023. The award comes after the launch of a special Songwriters & Composers Wing in the Recording Academy, which "elevates, supports and advocates on behalf of all songwriters and composers within (...) the industry at large".

According to the Wing's chair Evan Bogart, the new award is proof that composers and songwriters are now "able to make this dream of having an award that honors the compendium of an artist's yearly output and the impact it has each year on the musical landscape in the way the GRAMMYs have been honoring producers since 1975. I think the time to do that is now (...) People in the songwriting world have been calling for this award for more than a decade (...) We just came to the right moment in time to put the weight of the new Wing behind it and create it."

Nominated songwriters can come from any musical field, except Classical, as those composers are recognized in the Best Contemporary Classical Composition category.

Eligibility 
To qualify for the award, writers “must have written a minimum of five songs in which they are credited ‘solely’ as a songwriter or co-writer” and that “songs in which the songwriter was also credited as a primary or featured artist, producer or any other supporting role do not qualify to achieve a minimum song threshold for consideration”, a distinction that was mandated in order ensure that the award honored songwriting and prevents big-named artists who write and perform or produce the majority of their own music from dominating the category. If a writer meets the threshold with external songs, they are permitted to submit up to four additional songs in which they are also the performer. According to Evan Bogart, CEO of the Recording Academy's Songwriters & Composers Wing, “we were able to strike the right balance and tone between people who are professional songwriters, who wake up every day and think about crafting songs for artists, and not just make this another award for a producer or an artist to win”.

Prospective nominees can submit up to nine songs that they have written or co-written during the eligibility period of each Grammy year that demonstrate their skill and talent.

Winners and nominees

References 

Grammy Award categories
Songwriting awards